The thornback sculpin (Paricelinus hopliticus) is a species of sculpin native to the eastern Pacific Ocean from northern British Columbia, Canada to southern California, United States. This species grows to a length of  TL. This species is the only known member of its genus.

References

Jordaniidae
Monotypic fish genera
Fish described in 1869